Bufonaria echinata, the spiny frog shell,  is a species of sea snail, a marine gastropod mollusk in the family Bursidae, the frog shells.

Description
The shell size is between 50mm and 85 mm.

Distribution
This species occurs in the Red Sea; off Madagascar, in the Indian Ocean, off the Philippines and China.

References

  Dautzenberg, Ph. (1929). Contribution à l'étude de la faune de Madagascar: Mollusca marina testacea. Faune des colonies françaises, III(fasc. 4). Société d'Editions géographiques, maritimes et coloniales: Paris. 321-636, plates IV-VII pp.
 Vine, P. (1986). Red Sea Invertebrates. Immel Publishing, London. 224 pp.
 Drivas, J. & M. Jay (1988). Coquillages de La Réunion et de l'île Maurice.

External links
 Gastropods.com: Bufonaria (Bufonaria) echinata

Bursidae
Gastropods described in 1807